Phuket cuisine is from Phuket, Thailand and has Chinese, Malaysian, and Thai influences.

Dishes

Bee-Pang 

Bee-Pang is a crispy rice cut into a solid rectangle with sweet sauce as a type of cereal bar. Bee-pang is made from puffed rice mixed with fried garlic topped with sweet sauce to blend with the salt from the rice. People in Phuket usually eat this with tea in the afternoon.

Gaang sôm blah
Gaang sôm blah is a fish curry dish. It is prepared without the use of coconut milk.

Kanohm Jin 

Kanohm Jin is a noodle dish made from rice or fish and topped with sauce. Sauces include Tai-Pla sauce, nam phrik sauce, and Namya sauce. It is usually eaten for breakfast with fried Pah Tong Go and curried fish. Kanohm Jin comes with more than 10 kinds of fresh vegetables.

Lo Bah 

Lo Bah is deep fried pork organs served with fried tofu and spicy sweet sauce.

Mee Hoon Pa Chang 

Mee Hoon Pa Chang consists of noodles fried in soy sauce, topped with fried onion and accompanied by pork soup. The recipe was originated by ‘pa Chang’, so local people call the dish ‘Mee Hoon Pa Chang’.

Moo Hong 
Moo Hong is a stewed pork dish from Fujian cuisine. It is usually served with rice or boiled rice and served as the main meal. Pork belly is the main ingredient of the dish, but other cuts of pork can be used to balance the ratio between meat and fat. The dish also contains dark soy sauce and sugar for a sweet taste and garlic, pepper, and coriander roots for a black pepper flavor. Light soy sauce can be used for a more salty taste. The dish is garnished with fresh coriander. "Moo Palo" is similar to "Moo Hong” but Moo Palo contains Chinese five-spice.

Oh Tao 

Oh Tao is a hot fried oyster or seafood dish prepared with eggs, flour, bean sprouts and taro root. It can be seasoned with salt, sugar, chili or vinegar. It is usually eaten with bean sprouts and crispy pork. Oh Tao is one of the ancient dishes of the area.

Pàt tai
Pàt tai is a stir-fried noodle dish prepared using a curry paste typically containing chili peppers, tamarind, shrimp paste and sugar.

Snacks

Ah-pong 

Ah-pong is a pancake considered the signature snack of Phuket. It easy to make as the ingredients—flour, egg yolk, coconut milk, sugar, water and yeast— are readily available. It has a delicious, light sweet aroma from coconut milk.

Ang-Gu 

Ang-Gu is a popular sweet snack usually eaten with coffee or tea. From Chinese belief, turtles are the symbol of eternity so they believe that those who eat this snack will live endlessly like the turtles. This snack is made from glutinous rice flour, vegetable oil, sugar and gold nuts.

Bee-go-moi 

Bee-go-moi is a snack made of black, wet sticky rice with coconut milk. It has an interesting texture and flavor from the glutinous black sticky rice and the saltiness of the coconut milk.

Desserts

O-aew 

O-aew is a dessert originating from Phuket and considered to be the region's signature dessert. It is made from jellied banana-flour mixed with boiled red beans, ice, and sweet red syrup. Extra jellies and fruit are added to sweeten the dish.

See also

 List of Thai dishes
 List of Thai ingredients
 List of Thai restaurants

References

Further reading
 
  211 pages.

Thai cuisine